Arthur Conrad is an actor, known for The Night Patrol (1926) as "Terry the Rat," and The Prince of Pep (1925) as "Eddie-the-Sniff."

In the early 1900s known for playing in comedy. Described as an "excellent eccentric comedian" and a remarkable dancer.

In August, 1925, Conrad was part of a cast in a play in New York.

References 

American male silent film actors
20th-century American male actors
Year of birth missing
Year of death missing